The Corpus de Sang ("Corpus of Blood") was a riot which took place in Sant Andreu de Palomar and later in Barcelona on 7-10 June 1640, during Corpus Christi, which marked a turning point in the development of the Reapers' War.

The riot was between a group of harvesters and some local "andreuencs", during which one harvester was badly hurt.

References

Reapers' War
1640 in Europe
Riots and civil disorder in Spain
History of Barcelona
17th-century riots